The Maitreya teachings or Maitreyanism, also called Mile teachings, refers to the beliefs related to Maitreya (彌勒 Mílè in Chinese) practiced in China together with Buddhism and Manichaeism, and were developed in different ways both in the Chinese Buddhist schools and in the sect salvationist traditions of Chinese folk religion.

Maitreya was the central deity worshipped by the first folk salvation religions, but in later developments of the sects he was gradually replaced by the Limitless Ancient Mother (無生老母 Wúshēng Lǎomǔ), although Maitreyan eschatology continued to have a place in their doctrines.

Folk Buddhist movements that worshipped and awaited Maitreya are recorded at least back to the years between 509 and 515 (6th century). A notorious event was the rebellion led by monk Faqing from Jizhou City, then Northern Wei, in the name of a "new Buddha". Later, Maitreyan beliefs developed conspicuously outside the boundaries of Buddhism. By 715, as testified by an edict, wearing white clothes, that was originally a practice common to lay Buddhist congregations, had become a distinctive feature of Maitreyan sects.

See also
 White Lotus
 Chinese salvationist religions
 Three Suns (eschatology) 
 Yiguandao 
 Xiantiandao
 Luo teaching
 Miledadao

References

Sources
 Hubert Michael Seiwert. Popular Religious Movements and Heterodox Sects in Chinese History. Brill, 2003. 
 Xisha Ma, Huiying Meng. Popular Religion and Shamanism. BRILL, 2011. 

Chinese salvationist religions
Buddhism in China
Maitreya